Chandler Harnish (born July 28, 1988) is a former American football quarterback. He was the final pick of the 2012 NFL Draft, selected 253rd overall by the Indianapolis Colts, becoming Mr. Irrelevant 2012. He played college football for Northern Illinois University, where he was the Huskies' starting quarterback for four years. Harnish was also a member of the Minnesota Vikings.

Early life
A native of Bluffton, Indiana, Harnish attended Norwell High School in Ossian, Indiana, where he was a letterman in football, basketball, and track.  At Norwell, he passed for 4,760 yards and 48 touchdowns, and also ran for 2,343 yards and 35 touchdowns. He was also a safety where he tallied 129 tackles, seven fumble recoveries, five forced fumbles, and 13 pass deflections.  He holds multiple Norwell High School records, including career all-purpose yards (7,103). As a senior, he led the Norwell Knights to a 14–1 record and the runner-up spot in the Indiana 3A state championship. Harnish was awarded the 2006 3A Phil N. Eskew Mental Attitude Award and was named an all-state player and the Fort Wayne News Sentinel Athlete of the Year as a senior. Also, along with his brothers and sister, Chandler ran a sweet corn stand in Bluffton.

He also competed in basketball and track at Norwell. In basketball, Harnish earned all-conference honors as a junior and as a senior. In track & field, Harnish was one of the state's top performers in the sprinting and throwing events. In sprints, he recorded times of 11.26 seconds in the 100 meters and 23.16 seconds in the 200 meters. As a thrower, he placed sixth in the discus at the Indiana state championships as a junior. He was the conference, sectional, and regional discus champion who finished sixth in the State Finals as a junior, with a top-throw of 52.71 meters.

Regarded as a two-star recruit by Rivals.com, Harnish only scholarship offer came from Northern Illinois, which he accepted.

College career
On August 6, 2006, Harnish committed to Northern Illinois University, the only FBS school that made him a scholarship offer.

Despite not being heavily recruited out of high school, Harnish became one of the greatest quarterbacks in NIU history. He made his first start in the Huskies' first game of his freshman season.  In that game, he nearly led the team to an upset over the Big Ten's Minnesota Golden Gophers.  Harnish continued to be Huskies' starter for four straight years.  He led the Huskies to a bowl game in all four years that he started, an achievement that surpassed the combined total of Division I bowl appearances by all other NIU quarterbacks before him.

In his first three years at NIU (2008–2010), he started 31 games and totaled 7,332 yards of total offense, including 5,728 passing yards and 1,604 rushing yards.  He was selected as a first-team All-MAC player after the 2010 season, and also received the Vern Smith Leadership Award, as the best football player in the Mid-American Conference. He was voted MVP of the 2010 Humanitarian Bowl after posting 300 passing yards and a touchdown in the 40–17 victory.

During the 2011 regular season, Harnish had 4,043 yards of total offense, including 1,351 rushing yards and 2,692 passing yards.  Playing against Western Michigan on October 15, 2011, Harnish became only the 10th player in NCAA Division I FBS history with a 200–200 game, consisting of at least 200 rushing yards and 200 passing yards.  He rushed for a career-high 229 yards and passed for 203 yards in a 55–21 win over the Broncos.

Harnish's average of 7.9 yards per carry during the 2011 regular season ranked third among players in the NCAA Football Bowl Subdivision with at least 100 carries.

Harnish accumulated more than 11,000 yards of total offense in his four years at Northern Illinois.  He averaged 336.92 yards of total offense per game in 2011, ranking 7th in the Football Bowl Subdivision.  In November 2011, he was named one of 15 semifinalists for the Walter Camp Award as the best player in college football.

College statistics

Professional career

Indianapolis Colts
Harnish was selected in the seventh round (253rd overall) by the Indianapolis Colts in the 2012 NFL Draft. As the last pick in the draft, he was given the mock title of Mr. Irrelevant. On October 16, Harnish was released by Indianapolis, after being inactive for five regular season games. He was re-signed to the team's practice squad two days later, but did not participate in any games during the 2012 NFL season. He competed for the backup job against Matt Hasselbeck in the 2013 preseason, but was waived and later signed to the practice squad. He signed a reserve/futures contract on January 14, 2014, and was expected to be the backup to Andrew Luck. He was released by the Colts on August 30, 2014.

Minnesota Vikings
On September 29, 2014, Harnish signed with the Minnesota Vikings, who placed him on their practice squad after starting QB's Matt Cassel was placed on injured reserve and Teddy Bridgewater had sprained his ankle. On October 2, 2014, Harnish was put on the active roster to back up Christian Ponder in the Green Bay Packers vs. Minnesota Vikings game after Bridgewater, who was injured in the previous game against Atlanta was deactivated for the game. Harnish was waived the next day. On October 7, 2014, Harnish was re-signed to the Vikings practice squad and quarterback McLeod Bethel-Thompson was released.  On December 16, 2014, Harnish was released by the Vikings.

Arizona Cardinals
Harnish signed with the Arizona Cardinals on March 31, 2015. During the 2015 NFL Draft, he read the name of the 2015 Mr. Irrelevant, Gerald Christian. Harnish was released by the Cardinals on August 8, 2015.

References

External links
Indianapolis Colts bio
Northern Illinois Huskies bio

1988 births
Living people
People from Bluffton, Indiana
Players of American football from Indiana
American football quarterbacks
Northern Illinois Huskies football players
Indianapolis Colts players
Minnesota Vikings players
Arizona Cardinals players